Spencer McLennan (born October 10, 1966 in Kelowna, British Columbia) is a former Canadian football player in the Canadian Football League for ten years. McLennan played safety and slotback for the three teams, the British Columbia Lions, Montreal Alouettes and Winnipeg Blue Bombers  from 1991-2000. He also occasionally played cornerback. He was a CFL East All-Star in 1996.

References

1966 births
Living people
BC Lions players
Canadian football defensive backs
Canadian football return specialists
Canadian football slotbacks
Canadian people of Scottish descent
Montreal Alouettes players
Sportspeople from Kelowna
Players of Canadian football from British Columbia
Winnipeg Blue Bombers players